Travis Kuualiialoha Browne (born July 17, 1982) is an American retired  mixed martial artist who last competed as a Heavyweight in the Ultimate Fighting Championship (UFC).

Background
Browne was born in Hawaii to a father with Hawaiian Native Hawaiian ancestry and a European American mother. He played basketball and won the 2000 Coastal North League Player of the Year while attending high school in San Diego and then continued his career at Palomar College. Browne had no martial arts experience before being introduced to Brazilian jiu-jitsu at the age of 26. Browne also began training in boxing and had his first professional fight less than a year later.

Mixed martial arts career
Browne began his professional MMA career in 2009, fighting in smaller organizations such as Bellator Fighting Championships, Gladiator Challenge, and King of the Cage. He quickly amassed an undefeated winning streak of 9–0.

Ultimate Fighting Championship
In March 2010, Browne signed with the UFC. He made his debut at The Ultimate Fighter: Team Liddell vs. Team Ortiz Finale against James McSweeney. Browne won the fight via TKO at 4:32 of the first round.

Browne fought UFC veteran Cheick Kongo at UFC 120. The fight was even heading into the third round, with Browne winning the first round on the judge's scorecards and Kongo taking the second. In the third and final round, Kongo was penalized with a point deduction for repeatedly grabbing and holding Browne's shorts and the fight, therefore, resulted in a somewhat controversial draw.

Browne faced Stefan Struve on May 28, 2011, at UFC 130. He won the fight via superman punch KO in the first round, earning a "Knockout of the Night" bonus in the process.

Browne faced Rob Broughton on September 24, 2011, at UFC 135 where he won by unanimous decision (30–27, 30–27, and 30–27).

Browne agreed to fight UFC newcomer Chad Griggs on April 21, 2012, at UFC 145. He defeated Griggs by submission due to an arm-triangle choke in the first round. The performance earned Browne Submission of the Night honors.

Browne was expected to fight Ben Rothwell at UFC on FOX 4 on August 4, 2012, in Los Angeles, California. However, Rothwell was forced to pull out of the fight due to injury.

Browne faced Antônio Silva on October 5, 2012, at the main event of UFC on FX 5. Browne came out aggressive, showing a variety of striking techniques. Browne strained his left hamstring throwing a flashy kick. Silva was able to capitalize, backing Browne up, landing a big right hand, and finishing with punches from the top, giving Browne his first professional loss. A camera crew from Vice Media followed and interviewed Browne before and after the fight with Silva.

Browne faced Gabriel Gonzaga on April 13, 2013, at The Ultimate Fighter 17 Finale. Browne defeated Gonzaga via first-round knockout by elbows to the side of the head. The performance earned Browne Knockout of the Night honors. The win however was not without controversy as Browne not only held on to the fence to defend a takedown but also connected with illegal 12–6 elbows to the back of the head to Gonzaga. Gonzaga's appeal to the Nevada State Athletic Commission to overturn the fight to a no-contest was denied.

Browne faced Alistair Overeem on August 17, 2013, at UFC Fight Night 26. After surviving Overeem's initial flurry, Browne won via knockout due to a front kick and punches in the first round. The impressive knockout also earned Browne his third Knockout of the Night bonus award.

Browne faced Josh Barnett on December 28, 2013, at UFC 168. Browne won exactly a minute into the match via knockout due to elbows while Barnett was attempting a takedown. This earned him the Knockout of the Night bonus for his third straight fight.

Browne faced Fabrício Werdum on April 19, 2014, at UFC on Fox 11. Despite being a betting favorite with better considered striking, Browne was outstruck for nearly all five rounds after scoring an early knockdown on Werdum in the first round. Browne also said that he suffered a broken hand, ribs and dislocated his foot at some point during the fight. He lost the fight via unanimous decision (49–46, 50–45, and 50–45).

Browne faced Brendan Schaub on December 6, 2014, at UFC 181. He won the fight via TKO in the first round.

Browne faced Andrei Arlovski on May 23, 2015, at UFC 187. Despite being a heavy betting favorite, Browne lost the fight via TKO in the first round. After a back and forth round where both fighters were dropped, many instantly consider it one of the best one round fights in UFC history. The bout earned Browne his first Fight of the Night bonus award.

Browne faced Matt Mitrione on January 17, 2016, at UFC Fight Night 81. He won the fight via TKO in the third round. However, this win was controversial, as Mitrione suffered multiple eye pokes from Browne throughout the fight, with Browne even targeting the eye with jabs and punches, causing Mitrione to have an injured eye.

Browne next faced Cain Velasquez on July 9, 2016, at UFC 200. He lost the fight via TKO in the closing seconds of the first round.

Browne faced Fabrício Werdum in a rematch on September 10, 2016, at UFC 203. He lost the fight by unanimous decision (29–28, 29–27, and 30–27).

Browne faced Derrick Lewis on February 19, 2017, in the main event at UFC Fight Night 105 in Halifax, Nova Scotia. Despite hurting Lewis with body strikes in the first round, he lost the fight via knockout in the second round. Both participants were awarded Fight of the Night for their performance.

Browne faced Alexey Oleynik on July 8, 2017, at UFC 213. He lost the fight via submission in the second round. This result prompted UFC president Dana White to say "I think that Travis should retire." It was his last fight to date.

Personal life

Browne has two sons from his first marriage to Erin – Kaleo and Keawe. Browne married Jenna Renee Webb in January 2015. In July 2015, Webb posted Instagram photos showing multiple bruises on her body allegedly caused by Browne and claimed he beat her. As a result, Browne was removed from the UFC's International Fight Week events pending an investigation. On August 28, 2015, the UFC reinstated Browne when their independent investigation found "inconclusive evidence" in the domestic violence inquiry. Following the report, Webb publicly stated she is considering pressing charges. Browne and Webb divorced on February 21, 2016.

He has been in a relationship with former Women's Bantamweight champion Ronda Rousey since 2015. On April 20, 2017, Browne and Rousey announced their engagement. Browne proposed to Rousey under a waterfall in New Zealand. The two were married on August 26, 2017, in Hawaii., On April 21, 2021, Browne and Rousey announced on her official YouTube channel that she was four months pregnant. On June 29, 2021, Browne and Rousey announced that they were expecting a girl.
On September 27, 2021, Rousey and Browne announced the birth of their daughter La’akea Makalapuaokalanipō Browne.

Browne's moniker, 'Hapa', is derived from the term in Hawaii for a person who is mixed blood.

Browne attended the 2019 WWE Hall Of Fame ceremony with his wife, Ronda Rousey, who was working with the WWE. During the event, a fan rushed the stage and tackled Bret Hart, who was being inducted as a member of the tag team The Hart Foundation. Browne was one of several men who ran onto the stage to help subdue the man. Hart later thanked Browne the next night during WrestleMania 35.

Championships and accomplishments
 Ultimate Fighting Championship
 Fight of the Night (Two times) vs. Andrei Arlovski and Derrick Lewis
 Knockout of the Night (Four times) vs. Stefan Struve, Gabriel Gonzaga, Alistair Overeem and Josh Barnett
 Submission of the Night (One time)  vs. Chad Griggs
 Gladiator Challenge
 Interim Gladiator Challenge Heavyweight Championship (One time)
 Victory Fighting Championship
 VFC Heavyweight Championship (One time)
 World MMA Awards
 2013 Breakthrough Fighter of the Year
 2013 Comeback of the Year  vs. Alistair Overeem at UFC Fight Night: Shogun vs. Sonnen
 MMAJunkie.com
 2015 May Fight of the Month vs. Andrei Arlovski

Mixed martial arts record

|-
|Loss
|align=center|18–7–1
|Alexey Oleynik
|Submission (rear-naked choke)
|UFC 213
|
|align=center|2
|align=center|3:44
|Las Vegas, Nevada, United States
|
|-
|Loss
|align=center|18–6–1
|Derrick Lewis
|KO (punches)
|UFC Fight Night: Lewis vs. Browne
|
|align=center|2
|align=center|3:12
|Halifax, Nova Scotia, Canada
|
|-
|Loss
|align=center|
|Fabrício Werdum
|Decision (unanimous)
|UFC 203
|
|align=center|3
|align=center|5:00
|Cleveland, Ohio, United States
|
|-
|Loss
|align=center|18–4–1
|Cain Velasquez
|TKO (punches)
|UFC 200
|
|align=center|1
|align=center|4:57
|Las Vegas, Nevada, United States
|
|-
|Win
|align=center|18–3–1
|Matt Mitrione
|TKO (punches)
|UFC Fight Night: Dillashaw vs. Cruz
|
|align=center|3
|align=center|4:09
|Boston, Massachusetts, United States
|
|-
|Loss
|align=center|17–3–1
|Andrei Arlovski
|TKO (punches)
|UFC 187
|
|align=center|1
|align=center|4:41
|Las Vegas, Nevada, United States
|
|-
|Win
|align=center|17–2–1
|Brendan Schaub
|TKO (punches)
|UFC 181
|
|align=center|1
|align=center|4:50
|Las Vegas, Nevada, United States
|
|-
|Loss
|align=center|16–2–1
|Fabrício Werdum
|Decision (unanimous)
|UFC on Fox: Werdum vs. Browne
|
|align=center| 5
|align=center| 5:00
|Orlando, Florida, United States
|
|-
|Win
|align=center|16–1–1
|Josh Barnett
|KO (elbows)
|UFC 168
|
|align=center| 1
|align=center| 1:00
|Las Vegas, Nevada, United States
|
|-
|Win
|align=center|15–1–1
|Alistair Overeem
|KO (front kick and punches)
|UFC Fight Night: Shogun vs. Sonnen
|
|align=center|1
|align=center|4:08
|Boston, Massachusetts, United States
|
|-
|Win
|align=center|14–1–1
|Gabriel Gonzaga
|KO (elbows)
|The Ultimate Fighter: Team Jones vs. Team Sonnen Finale
|
|align=center|1
|align=center|1:11
|Las Vegas, Nevada, United States
|
|-
|Loss
|align=center|13–1–1
|Antônio Silva
|TKO (punches)
|UFC on FX: Browne vs. Bigfoot
|
|align=center|1
|align=center|3:27
|Minneapolis, Minnesota, United States
|
|-
|Win
|align=center|13–0–1
|Chad Griggs
|Submission (arm-triangle choke)
|UFC 145
|
|align=center|1
|align=center|2:29
|Atlanta, Georgia, United States
|
|-
|Win
|align=center|12–0–1
|Rob Broughton
|Decision (unanimous)
|UFC 135
|
|align=center|3
|align=center|5:00
|Denver, Colorado, United States
|
|-
|Win
|align=center|11–0–1
|Stefan Struve
|KO (punch)
|UFC 130
|
|align=center|1
|align=center|4:11
|Las Vegas, Nevada, United States
|
|-
| Draw
|align=center|10–0–1
|Cheick Kongo
|Draw (unanimous)
|UFC 120
|
|align=center|3
|align=center|5:00
|London, England
|
|-
|Win
|align=center|10–0
|James McSweeney
|TKO (punches)
|The Ultimate Fighter: Team Liddell vs. Team Ortiz Finale
|
|align=center|1
|align=center|4:32
|Las Vegas, Nevada, United States
|
|-
|Win
|align=center|9–0
|Aaron Brink
|KO (punches)
|Gladiator Challenge 111
|
|align=center|1
|align=center|0:35
|San Jacinto, California, United States
|
|-
|Win
|align=center|8–0
|Abe Wagner
|TKO (punches)
|VFC 30 – Night of Champions
|
|align=center|1
|align=center|0:10
|Council Bluffs, Iowa, United States
|
|-
|Win
|align=center|7–0
|Brian Campbell
|KO (head kick)
|Gladiator Challenge 107
|
|align=center|1
|align=center|0:10
|San Jacinto, California, United States
|
|-
|Win
|align=center|6–0
|Matt Anderson
|TKO (punches)
|Gladiator Challenge 98
|
|align=center|2
|align=center|0:49
|San Jacinto, California, United States
|
|-
|Win
|align=center|5–0
|Mychal Clark
|Decision (unanimous)
|Bellator 10
|
|align=center|3
|align=center|5:00
|Ontario, California, United States
|
|-
|Win
|align=center|4–0
|Sergio Calderon
|KO (punches)
|Gladiator Challenge 93
|
|align=center|1
|align=center|1:53
|Pauma Valley, California, United States
|
|-
|Win
|align=center|3–0
|Tom Lozano
|Submission (armbar)
|EF 9 – Espartan Fighting 9
|
|align=center|1
|align=center|0:55
|Puerto Escondido, Mexico
|
|-
|Win
|align=center|2–0
|Michael Westbrook
|TKO (knee injury)
|KOTC: Immortal
|
|align=center|3
|align=center|1:22
|San Bernardino, California, United States
|
|-
|Win
|align=center|1–0
|Evan Langford
|TKO (punches)
|Cage of Fire 15
|
|align=center|1
|align=center|0:43
|Tijuana, Mexico
|

See also
 List of current UFC fighters
 List of male mixed martial artists

References

External links
 Travis Browne's Official MMA Record
 
 

1982 births
Living people
People from Oahu
American male mixed martial artists
American practitioners of Brazilian jiu-jitsu
People awarded a black belt in Brazilian jiu-jitsu
Heavyweight mixed martial artists
Mixed martial artists utilizing boxing
Mixed martial artists utilizing Muay Thai
Mixed martial artists utilizing Brazilian jiu-jitsu
Mixed martial artists from Hawaii
People from Honolulu County, Hawaii
Boxers from Hawaii
American people of Native Hawaiian descent
Native Hawaiian sportspeople
Native Hawaiian people
American male boxers
American Muay Thai practitioners
Ultimate Fighting Championship male fighters